This is a list of Chinese-English translators.

Lists and biographies of translators of contemporary literature (fiction, essays, poetry) are maintained by Paper Republic, Modern Chinese Literature and Culture (MCLC), and on the Renditions Translator database.

A 

 Eric Abrahamsen

B
 John Balcom
Geremie Barme
 Samuel Beal
 Charles Henry Brewitt-Taylor
 Witter Bynner

C
 Yuen Ren Chao
 Chen Maiping
 Cheng Yang-ping
 Chi Pang-yuan
 Thomas Cleary
 Arthur Cooper (translator)

D
 Homer H. Dubs

E
 Jane English

F
 Gia-Fu Feng

G
 Herbert Giles
 Lionel Giles
 Howard Goldblatt — translator of contemporary Chinese fiction
 Eleanor Goodman - translator of contemporary Chinese poetry
 Gu Hongming
 Robert van Gulik

H
 Lloyd Haft
 Nicky Harman
 David Hawkes (sinologist) — translator of the Chinese classic Story of the Stone or Dream of the Red Chamber, by Cao Xueqin
 David Hinton
 Brian Holton (translator)
 Huang Ai

I
 Jeremy Ingalls

J
 Linda Jaivin

K
 George Kao
 Gregory B. Lee
 Mabel Lee
 James Legge
 Sylvia Li-chun Lin
 Lin Wusong
 Perry Link
 Julia Lovell
 Charles Luk

L
 Ken Liu

M
 John Minford
 Stephen Mitchell (translator)

P
 Martin Palmer
 David Pollard
 Ezra Pound

Q
 Qiu Xiaolong

R
 Michael Rank
 Jo Riley
 Rudolf Ritsema
 David Tod Roy

S
 Michael Saso
 Sidney Shapiro
 William Edward Soothill
 Fiona Sze-Lorrain

T
Jeremy Tiang
Robert Thom (translator)

U
 Edna W. Underwood

V
 Laura Veirs

W
 Arthur Waley
 Wang Chi-chen
 Helen Wang — translator of contemporary Chinese literature, especially fiction for children
Annelise Finegan Wasmoen - winner of 2015 Best Translated Book Award
 Burton Watson
 Thomas Watters
 Timothy C. Wong

X
 Xu Yuanchong

Y
 Gladys Yang
 Yang Xianyi

References

 
Literary translators